Sámi costume is the traditional clothing that reveals ethnicity of the Sami people in Northern Scandinavia and the Kola Peninsula. The style of clothing varies among regions and language groups, but there are many common or similar elements. Traditional elements are often included in modern Sámi clothing to signify Sámi identity.

Elements and outfits (using the Northern Sámi language terms) include:
Beaska, a traditional Sámi fur coat, made of reindeer
Boagán, belt
Four Winds hat ( or ), a traditional Sámi headgear
Gákti, traditional Sámi clothing
Liidni, traditional Sámi shawl
, a traditional Sámi women's hat with a horn-shaped top
Luhkka, traditional Sámi  winter clothing
Nutukas, Sámi boots
Vuotta, shoe bands

References

External links

Sámi clothing